Benjamin Chaha (1940 – 9 March 2022) was a Nigerian politician who was the second Speaker of the House of Representatives of Nigeria in the Second Nigerian Republic, from October 1983 to December 1983.

Chaha was born in Nigeria in 1940. He died on 9 March 2022, at the age of 82.

References

1940 births
2022 deaths
National Party of Nigeria politicians
Speakers of the House of Representatives (Nigeria)